The 1960 1000 km Buenos Aires took place on 31 January, on the Autódromo Municipal-Avenida Paz, (Buenos Aires, Argentina).  It was the sixth running of the race, and after a year off, it returned to be the opening round of the F.I.A. World Sports Car Championship. However, this was to be last time to race was held until a non-championship race was held in 1970

Report

Entry

A grand total of 28 racing cars were registered for this event, of which all 28 arrived for practice and 27 for qualifying for the race. As with previous races in Argentina, the race was poorly supported by the work of teams. Only Scuderia Ferrari and Porsche KG sent works cars from Europe. The Italian marque had entered three of the stunning Ferrari 250 TR 59/60 for Richie Ginther/Wolfgang von Trips, Phil Hill/Cliff Allison and Ludovico Scarfiotti/José Froilán González. As for Porsche, they also entered three cars, their 718 RSK were piloted by Jo Bonnier/Graham Hill, Olivier Gendebien/Edgar Barth and Maurice Trintignant/Hans Herrmann

Qualifying

After a three-hour qualifying session held on the three days prior to the race, it was Phil Hill who took pole position for Scuderia Ferrari in their 250 TR.

Race

The race was held over 106 laps of the 5.888 mile, Autódromo Municipal-Avenida Paz, giving a distance of 624.162 miles (1,004.49 km). Due to the lack of opposition as the Porsches were racing in a different class, it was left to Ferrari to battle amongst themselves. The race was overshadowed by the fatal accident involving the American, Harry Blanchard, whose Porsche 718 RSK had crashed on the first lap, overturned and hit several times by other cars.

In the race, the Scuderia Ferrari of Hill and Allison, won ahead of their team-mates Ginther/von Trips. Car number 4, took an impressive victory, winning in a time of 6hrs 17:12.1 mins, averaging a speed of 99.283 mph. Second place went to the second Ferrari, albeit a lap adrift. The podium was complete by the S1.6 class winner, Bonnier/Hill who in return were a further four laps behind.

Official Classification

Class Winners are in Bold text.

 Fastest Lap: Dan Gurney, 3:22.4secs (104.733 mph)

Class Winners

Standings after the race

Note: Only the top five positions are included in this set of standings.
Championship points were awarded for the first six places in each race in the order of 8-6-4-3-2-1. Manufacturers were only awarded points for their highest finishing car with no points awarded for positions filled by additional cars. Only the best 3 results out of the 5 races could be retained by each manufacturer. Points earned but not counted towards the championship totals are listed within brackets in the above table.

References

1000 km Buenos Aires
1000 km Buenos Aires
Buenos Aires